Manjula Reddy (born 1965) is an Indian bacterial geneticist. She is  the chief scientist at the Centre for Cellular and Molecular Biology in Hyderabad, India. In 2019, she won the Infosys Prize in Life Sciences for her work on bacterial cell wall structure and synthesis. She is a Fellow of the Telangana Academy of Sciences and the Indian Academy of Sciences.

Education and career 
Manjula Reddy earned her PhD from the Centre for Cellular and Molecular Biology in 2002. She started her own lab at the institution in 2007.

Research 
Manjula Reddy conducts research on bacterial cell walls. 

She identified a novel "spacemaker" enzyme encoded by the open reading frame called MepK in Escherichia coli. She found that this enzyme hydrolyses certain cross-links in peptidoglycan thereby allowing the bacterial cell wall to expand. She aims to develop novel antimicrobials that can target the peptidoglycan synthesis pathway. She uses the model organisms Mycobacterium smegmatis and Escherechia coli.

She was part of the team of scientists who patented the process for identifying mutagens and anti-mutagens. This process was patented from 1999 to 2018 in the United States. The other scientists in the team were Jayaraman Gowrishankar and Shanti M. Bharatan.

Awards and honors 

 Infosys Prize in Life Sciences (2019)
 Fellow of the Indian Academy of Sciences (2020)
 Fellow of the Telangana Academy of Sciences
 Editorial board member of the Journal of Bacteriology

Personal life 
She has stated in an interview that her father, Mohan Reddy, and her mother were supportive of her career as a scientist. She is married to a cardiologist and has two sons.

Selected publications 

 Chodisetti, Pavan Kumar, and Manjula Reddy. "Peptidoglycan hydrolase of an unusual cross-link cleavage specificity contributes to bacterial cell wall synthesis." Proceedings of the National Academy of Sciences 116.16 (2019): 7825-7830.
 Singh, Santosh Kumar, et al. "Regulated proteolysis of a cross-link–specific peptidoglycan hydrolase contributes to bacterial morphogenesis." Proceedings of the National Academy of Sciences 112.35 (2015): 10956-10961.
 Reddy, Manjula. "Role of FtsEX in cell division of Escherichia coli: viability of ftsEX mutants is dependent on functional SufI or high osmotic strength." Journal of bacteriology 189.1 (2007): 98-108.

References 

1965 births
Living people
21st-century Indian women scientists
21st-century Indian scientists
Indian geneticists
Fellows of the Indian Academy of Sciences
University of Hyderabad alumni